Petersham is a census-designated place (CDP) comprising the main village in the town of Petersham, Worcester County, Massachusetts, United States. Massachusetts Route 32 passes through the village, leading north  to Athol and southeast  to Barre. Massachusetts Route 122 joins Route 32 in the village center, leading southeast with it to Barre but northwest  to Orange.

As of the 2010 census, the population of the CDP was 243, out of 1,234 in the entire town of Petersham.

Demographics

References 

Census-designated places in Worcester County, Massachusetts
Census-designated places in Massachusetts